Stephen Deutsch (July 17, 1945) is a filmmaker, professor, and film score composer who has composed over 30 scores for film, theatre, radio, and television. His many collaborations with the playwright Peter Barnes include Jubilee (2001), the Olivier Award-winning play Red Noses (1985) and the feature film Hard Times (1994).

Career
He was a sound designer/composer on two films, Wild South and Postcards from, Applecross, which he also directed.

He has published one novel about music: Zweck. His second novel, Champion, was set in France and Germany in the 1930s was published in July 2020. He was editor of The Soundtrack and The New Soundtrack journals from 2007-2018.

Deutsch was educated initially in the United States (initial training - Juilliard Preparatory Division; BMus - SMU; MA - San Francisco State College). After settling in Britain, he attended the Royal College of Music where he was engaged in electro-acoustic composition under the direction of Tristram Cary. In 1971, he and two partners established Synthesiser Music Services, Ltd., an electro-acoustic studio in London.

At Bournemouth University, he was Professor of Post-Production. In 1992, he founded the University's PGDip/M.A. in Electro-Acoustic Music for Film and Television (later called Composing for the Screen). He was also Senior Tutor in Screen Composition at the National Film and Television School.

References

External links

1945 births
Living people
American people of Jewish descent
Academics of Bournemouth University
American film score composers
American male film score composers
People from Brooklyn
San Francisco State University alumni
Juilliard School Pre-College Division alumni
Alumni of the Royal College of Music
Southern Methodist University alumni
Labour Party (UK) people